Al-Hafez (Arabic 'The Protector') is a Salafi Islamic channel from Egypt.
It promotes teaching and recitation of the Quran. In addition, as a reaction to the Egyptian Revolution of 2011, the channel promotes the political orientation of Islamist parties and serves as a platform to attack their opponents.

Goals
 Memorization of the Quran and implanting it into the hearts of Muslims.
 Teaching and learning the Quran and its provisions.
 Removing suspicions about the Quran and keeping it from misrepresentation and distortion.
 Interest in the study of the Hadith.

Programming
Channel programs revolve around the following topics:
 Memorization of the Quran and its recitation.
 Quran miracles in all fields.
 Sunnah.
 Clarification of doubts, revealing falsehoods, and responding to them.
 Tales of memorizing and those that have mastered the memorization of the Quran.
 Calligraphy.
 Quran and life.
 Ethics of the Quran.
 Defense of the Muslim Brotherhood and the attack on their opponents in a way seen by some as inappropriate.

Controversy
Al-Hafez was sued following the broadcasting of offensive language. The reason for this was that Atef Abel Rasheed, the presenter of the show 'Fee el-Mezan', hosted two sheikhs whose language and opinions were seen as being offensive: Sheikh Abdallah Badr, who slandered Egyptian actress Elham Shahin, and Salafi Sheikh Mahmoud Shaaban, who issued a fatwa on air calling for the assassination of opposition leaders. Following Badr's comments about her on air, Shahin filed a lawsuit with the Administrative Court of the State Council demanding that Al-Hafez be shut down and its licenses revoked. Badr, a controversial preacher notorious for the coarse language and insults he directs at opponents, had described Shahin on his show as being “promiscuous, naked, and lascivious,” and also called her a “prostitute” and “infidel," according to clips shown to the court by the public prosecution. In December 2012, the Zaweya al-Hamra Court sentenced him to one year in prison and ordered him to pay a LE20,000 fine. Badr announced that he will not make any more media appearances and will focus solely on preaching.

References

Islamic television networks
Arabic-language television stations